Asterivora colpota is a moth in the family Choreutidae. It was first described by Edward Meyrick in 1911. It is endemic to New Zealand and is found throughout the North and South Islands. It is regarded as a lowland species and adults are on the wing from November until March. This moth has been collected by beating shrubs.

Taxonomy 

This species was first described by Edward Meyrick in 1911, using a specimen collected by Alfred Philpott at West Plains in Invercargill, and was named Simaethis colpota. In 1927 Alfred Philpott studied the male genitalia of this species. George Hudson discussed and illustrated this species in his 1928 publication The butterflies and moths of New Zealand. In 1979 J. S. Dugdale placed this species within the genus Asterivora. In 1988 Dugdale confirmed this placement. The holotype female specimen is held at the Natural History Museum, London.

Description  

Meyrick described this species as follows:
Meyrick stated that this species was similar in appearance to Asterivora combinatana but that it could be distinguished from it via the discal mark as well as the second line on the forewings.

Distribution 
This species is endemic to New Zealand and can be found throughout the North and South Islands.

Habitat 
This species is regarded as living in lowland habitat.

Behaviour 
This species is on the wing from November until March. This moth has been collected by beating shrubs.

References

Asterivora
Moths of New Zealand
Endemic fauna of New Zealand
Moths described in 1911
Taxa named by Edward Meyrick
Endemic moths of New Zealand